Naidăș is a commune in Caraș-Severin County, western Romania with a population of 1314 people. It is composed of two villages, Lescovița (Néramogyorós) and Naidăș.

Naidăș is the site of a border crossing with Serbia. The village of Kaluđerovo is on the opposite side.

Natives
 Radenko Stanković

References

Communes in Caraș-Severin County
Localities in Romanian Banat
Romania–Serbia border crossings